Danny Cole is an American painter and interdisciplinary artist based in New York City. Cole is known for his art of his imaginary The Creature World and the extravagant means with which he presents it.

Cole has shared his art on the streets of New York, the main stage of Coachella, and at many one-night shows that draw hundreds of attendees at short notice.

Early life 
Cole described himself as growing up very social, but descending into a deep dissociation that led him to become isolated. He found solace and understanding in the imaginary world he now depicts in his paintings. His artwork allows him to make this internal place of comfort into something that could be seen, touched, and shared.

Cole has been creating art since he was young, only recently showing it publicly. He filled journals with drawings of his creatures before moving to painting.

Cole moved to New York to pursue his career as an artist soon after graduating high school.

Career 
Cole's debut solo show, "Danny Cole's Departure" was held in partnership with Stephan Alexander's Ghost Gallery in the Lower East Side shortly before his high school graduation.

In the weeks before this, Cole went to Coachella with Portugal. The Man to exhibit his artwork as the band's live visuals on the main stage.

Cole directed the animated music video for Cherry Glazerr's song "Daddi."

Cole, Matt Shultz of Cage The Elephant, and Beck held an art show in Greenpoint, Brooklyn, shot by Rolling Stone with a photo journal.

In January 2020 a Converse editorial highlighted Cole's art.

Reception
In 2018, New York magazine Milk introduced Cole: "It’s not often that you get the opportunity to speak with a prodigy. But if you ever do, you’ll know. Danny Cole is an 18-year-old up-and-coming artist, and we’ve been watching his star on the rise."

Paramind wrote of Cole's mission, "He accepts the power of connectivity and utilizes it within his every word, action, and most of all, within his every project and painting. It’s truly his mission to see humans hand in hand, listening when needed and speaking freely when required."

References 

21st-century American painters
American graffiti artists
Guerilla artists
2000 births
Living people